William Samuel Hugh Laidlaw (born 3 January 1956, Kensington) is the Executive Chairman of Neptune Energy, the independent E&P company. He is former chief executive officer of Centrica, the British natural gas and electricity company.

Early life
He is the son of Sir Christophor Laidlaw (1922–2010), a manager at British Petroleum who went on to be deputy chairman, and was later chairman of computer maker ICL. Sam Laidlaw attended Eton College and studied law at Gonville and Caius College, Cambridge, gaining an MA in 1977. He qualified as a solicitor in 1979 with the Macfarlanes law company. He obtained an MBA in 1981 from the INSEAD Business School in Fontainebleau, France; his father was for a time the chairman of the school's UK advisory body.

Career
Laidlaw was with U.S. oil company Amerada Hess (1981–2001), building their North Sea business before running their worldwide exploration and production business and becoming president and chief operating officer (1995–2001). He was executive vice-president of global business development of the California-based Chevron Corporation from May 2003 and became chief executive officer of Enterprise Oil in 2002 (which was bought under his leadership by Shell in 2002 for £3.5bn). Enterprise Oil also faced a hostile takeover from Eni, the Rome-based oil company.

In January 2008, he was appointed a non-executive director of HSBC Holdings plc, and in December 2010 he was appointed as the lead non-executive director on the board of the Department for Transport. He was also a member of the UK Prime Minister's Business Advisory Group (2010–2012). Until August 2007, he was a non-executive director of Hanson plc. He is a trustee of the medical charity RAFT.

He has been chairman of the Petroleum Science and Technology Institute, based in Aberdeen, a director of the National Engineering Laboratory and president of the United Kingdom Offshore Operators Association. He chaired a report on business and higher education for the CBI in 2010 and led the inquiry into the failure of the competition for the West Coast Rail Franchise in 2012.

He joined Centrica in July 2006, taking over from Sir Roy Gardner and becoming chairman of the executive committee and the disclosure committee.

In 2015, he founded Neptune Energy, an international oil and gas exploration and production company, and is the firm’s first Executive Chairman.

He has also been a member of the UK Government’s Energy Advisory Panel, President of the UK Offshore Operators Association, a member of the Prime Minister’s Business Advisory Group, the Senior Director for the Department of Transport and a non-executive director of both HSBC Holdings plc and Hanson plc.
He is a non-executive director of Rio Tinto plc and Chairman of the National Centre for Universities and Business (NCUB).

Personal life
Laidlaw married Deborah (Debbie) Morris-Adams in Aylesbury Vale, Buckinghamshire in April 1989; they have three sons and a daughter.

References

External links
 Profile at Centrica – archived September 2011
 Becoming Executive Vice President of Chevron in 2003

News items
 Low carbon future in December 2009
 Scotland on Sunday May 2009 discussing nuclear power
 Guardian February 2009
 Times August 2008
 Telegraph July 2008
 Times June 2008
 Telegraph February 2008
 British Gas makes £571m profit in 2007
 Becoming boss of Centrica in March 2006

Video clips
 Prince's Rainforests in November 2009
 Corporate responsibility at Centrica in June 2009
 Centrica's profits decline 20% as seen on the BBC in July 2008

Alumni of Gonville and Caius College, Cambridge
British chief executives in the energy industry
British corporate directors
Centrica people
English chief executives
English solicitors
INSEAD alumni
People educated at Eton College
1956 births
People from Kensington
Living people